F. Andy Messing is an Executive Director for the National Defense Council Foundation and a retired Major.

Media
Messing has appeared on C-SPAN a total of ten times, his first appearance being a call-in show in 1985.

In 2007, Messing appeared as an archive source in the first episode of the History Channel program, Save the History.

References

External links
 
 F. Andy Messing Jr. at IMDb
 National Defense Council Foundation Official website
 National Defense Council Foundation at RightWeb

Living people
Year of birth missing (living people)